The House of Hohenzollern is a German royal (and from 1871 to 1918, imperial) dynasty whose members were variously princes, electors, kings and emperors of Hohenzollern, Brandenburg, Prussia, the German Empire, and Romania. The family came from the area around the town of Hechingen in Swabia during the late 11th century and took their name from Hohenzollern Castle. The first ancestors of the Hohenzollerns were mentioned in 1061.

The Hohenzollern family split into two branches, the Catholic Swabian branch and the Protestant Franconian branch, which ruled the Burgraviate of Nuremberg and later became the Brandenburg-Prussian branch. The Swabian branch ruled the principalities of Hohenzollern-Hechingen and Hohenzollern-Sigmaringen until 1849, and also ruled Romania from 1866 to 1947. Members of the Franconian branch became Margrave of Brandenburg in 1415 and Duke of Prussia in 1525.

The Margraviate of Brandenburg and the Duchy of Prussia were ruled in personal union after 1618 and were called Brandenburg-Prussia. From there, the Kingdom of Prussia was created in 1701, eventually leading to the unification of Germany and the creation of the German Empire in 1871, with the Hohenzollerns as hereditary German Emperors and Kings of Prussia.

Germany's defeat in World War I in 1918 led to the German Revolution. The Hohenzollerns were overthrown and the Weimar Republic was established, thus bringing an end to the German and Prussian monarchy. Georg Friedrich, Prince of Prussia is the current head of the formerly royal Prussian line, while Karl Friedrich, Prince of Hohenzollern is the head of the formerly princely Swabian line.

County of Zollern
 

Zollern, from 1218 Hohenzollern, was a county of the Holy Roman Empire. Later its capital was Hechingen.

The Hohenzollerns named their estates after Hohenzollern Castle in the Swabian Alps. The Hohenzollern Castle lies on an 855 meters high mountain called Hohenzollern. It still belongs to the family today.

The dynasty was first mentioned in 1061. According to the medieval chronicler Berthold of Reichenau, Burkhard I, Count of Zollern (de Zolorin) was born before 1025 and died in 1061.

In 1095, Count Adalbert of Zollern founded the Benedictine monastery of Alpirsbach, situated in the Black Forest.

The Zollerns received the Graf title from Emperor Henry V in 1111.

As loyal vassals of the Swabian Hohenstaufen dynasty, they were able to significantly enlarge their territory. Count Frederick III (c. 1139 – c. 1200) accompanied Emperor Frederick Barbarossa against Henry the Lion in 1180, and through his marriage was granted the Burgraviate of Nuremberg by Emperor Henry VI in 1192. In about 1185, he married Sophia of Raabs, the daughter of Conrad II, Burgrave of Nuremberg. After the death of Conrad II who left no male heirs, Frederick III was granted Nuremberg as Burgrave Frederick I.

In 1218, the burgraviate passed to Frederick's elder son Conrad I, he thereby became the ancestor of the Franconian Hohenzollern branch, which acquired the Electorate of Brandenburg in 1415.

Counts of Zollern (1061–1204)
 until 1061: Burkhard I
 before 1125: Frederick I
 between ca. 1125 and 1142: Frederick II, eldest son of Frederick I
 between ca. 1143 and 1150–1155: Burkhard II, 2nd oldest son of Frederick I
 between ca. 1150–1155 and 1160: Gotfried of Zimmern, 4th oldest son of Frederick I
 before 1171 – c. 1200: Frederick III/I (son of Frederick II, also Burgrave of Nuremberg)

After Frederick's death, his sons partitioned the family lands between themselves:
 Conrad I received the county of Zollern and exchanged it for the Burgraviate of Nuremberg with his younger brother Frederick IV in 1218, thereby founding the Franconian branch of the House of Hohenzollern. Members of the Franconian line eventually became the Brandenburg-Prussia branch and later converted to Protestantism.
 Frederick IV received the burgraviate of Nuremberg in 1200 from his father and exchanged it for the county of Zollern in 1218 with his brother, thereby founding the Swabian branch of the House of Hohenzollern, which remains Catholic.

Franconian branch
The senior Franconian branch of the House of Hohenzollern was founded by Conrad I, Burgrave of Nuremberg (1186–1261).

The family supported the Hohenstaufen and Habsburg rulers of the Holy Roman Empire during the 12th to 15th centuries, being rewarded with several territorial grants. Beginning in the 16th century, this branch of the family became Protestant and decided on expansion through marriage and the purchase of surrounding lands.

In the first phase, the family gradually added to their lands, at first with many small acquisitions in the Franconian region of Germany:
 Ansbach in 1331
 Kulmbach in 1340

In the second phase, the family expanded their lands further with large acquisitions in the Brandenburg and Prussian regions of Germany and present-day Poland:
 Margraviate of Brandenburg in 1417
 Duchy of Prussia in 1525
These acquisitions eventually transformed the Franconian Hohenzollerns from a minor German princely family into one of the most important dynasties in Europe.

From 8 January 1701 the title of Elector of Brandenburg was attached to the title of King in Prussia and, from 13 September 1772, to that of King of Prussia.

Burgraves of Nuremberg (1192–1427)

 1192–1200/1204: Frederick I (also count of Zollern as Frederick III)
 1204–1218: Frederick II (son of, also count of Zollern as Frederick IV)
 1218–1261/1262: Conrad I/III (brother of, also count of Zollern)
 1262–1297: Frederick III (c. 1220–1297), son of
 1297–1300: John I (c. 1279–1300), son of
 1300–1332: Frederick IV (1287–1332), brother of
 1332–1357: John II (c. 1309–1357), son of
 1357–1397: Frederick V (before 1333–1398), son of

At Frederick V's death on 21 January 1398, his lands were partitioned between his two sons:

 1397–1420: John III/I (son of, also Margrave of Brandenburg-Kulmbach)
 1397–1427: Frederick VI/I/I, (brother of, also Elector and Margrave of Brandenburg, also Margrave of Brandenburg-Ansbach and Brandenburg-Kulmbach)

After John III/I's death on 11 June 1420, the margraviates of Brandenburg-Ansbach and Brandenburg-Kulmbach were briefly reunited under Frederick VI/I/I. He ruled the Margraviate of Brandenburg-Ansbach after 1398. From 1420, he became Margrave of Brandenburg-Kulmbach. From 1411 Frederick VI became governor of Brandenburg and later Elector and Margrave of Brandenburg as Frederick I. Upon his death on 21 September 1440, his territories were divided among his sons:

 Frederick II, Elector of Brandenburg
 Albert III, Elector of Brandenburg and Margrave of Brandenburg-Ansbach
 John II, Margrave of Brandenburg-Kulmbach

In 1427 Frederick, Elector of Brandenburg sold Nuremberg Castle and his rights as burgrave to the Imperial City of Nuremberg. The territories of Brandenburg-Ansbach and Brandenburg-Kulmbach remained possessions of the family, once parts of the Burgraviate of Nuremberg.

Margraves of Brandenburg-Ansbach (1398–1791)

 1398–1440: Frederick I (also Margrave of Brandenburg-Kulmbach)
 1440–1486: Albert I/I/III Achilles (son of, also Margrave of Brandenburg-Kulmbach and Elector of Brandenburg)
 1486–1515: Frederick II/II  (son of, also Margrave of Brandenburg-Kulmbach)
 1515–1543: George I/I the Pious (son of, also Duke of Brandenburg-Jägerndorf)
 1543–1603: George Frederick I/I/I/I (son of, also Margrave of Brandenburg-Kulmbach, Duke of Brandenburg-Jägerndorf and Regent of Prussia)
 1603–1625: Joachim Ernst (1583–1625), son of John George of Brandenburg
 1625–1634: Frederick III (1616–1634), son of
 1634–1667: Albert II, brother of
 1667–1686: John Frederick (1654–1686), son of
 1686–1692: Christian I Albrecht, son of
 1692–1703: George Frederick II/II (brother of, later Margrave of Brandenburg-Kulmbach)
 1703–1723: William Frederick (before 1686–1723), brother of
 1723–1757: Charles William (1712–1757), son of
 1757–1791: Christian II Frederick (1736–1806) (son of, also Margrave of Brandenburg-Kulmbach)

On 2 December 1791, Christian II Frederick sold the sovereignty of his principalities to King Frederick William II of Prussia.

Margraves of Brandenburg-Kulmbach (1398–1604), later Brandenburg-Bayreuth (1604–1791)

 1398–1420: John I (c. 1369–1420), son of Frederick V of Nuremberg
 1420–1440: Frederick I (also Margrave of Brandenburg-Ansbach)
 1440–1457: John II (1406–1464), son of
 1457–1486: Albert I/I/III Achilles (also Margrave of Brandenburg-Ansbach and Elector of Brandenburg)
 1486–1495: Siegmund (1468–1495), son of
 1495–1515: Frederick II/II (also Margrave of Brandenburg-Ansbach)
 1515–1527: Casimir (1481–1527), son of
 1527–1553: Albert II Alcibiades (1522–1557), son of
 1553–1603: George Frederick I/I/I/I (also Margrave of Brandenburg-Ansbach, Duke of Brandenburg-Jägerndorf and Regent of Prussia)
 1603–1655: Christian I (1581–1655), son of John George, of Brandenburg
 1655–1712: Christian II Ernst (1644–1712), son of Erdmann August 
 1712–1726: George I William (1678–1726), son of 
 1726–1735: George Frederick II/II (previously Margrave of Kulmbach)
 1735–1763: Frederick IV (1711–1763), son of 
 1763–1769: Frederick V Christian (1708–1769), son of Christian Heinrich
 1769–1791: Charles Alexander (also Margrave of Brandenburg-Ansbach)

On 2 December 1791, Charles Alexander sold the sovereignty of his principalities to King Frederick William II of Prussia.

Dukes of Jägerndorf (1523–1622)

The Duchy of Jägerndorf (Krnov) was purchased in 1523.
 1541–1543: George I the Pious (also Margrave of Brandenburg-Ansbach)
 1543–1603: George Frederick I (also Margrave of Brandenburg-Ansbach, Margrave of Brandenburg-Kulmbach and Regent of Prussia)
 1603–1606: Joachim I  (also Regent of Prussia and Elector of Brandenburg)
 1606–1621: Johann Georg von Brandenburg

The duchy of Jägerndorf was confiscated by Emperor Ferdinand III in 1622.

Brandenburg-Prussian branch

Margraves of Brandenburg (1415–1619)

In 1411, Frederick VI, Burgrave of the small but wealthy Nuremberg, was appointed governor of Brandenburg in order to restore order and stability. At the Council of Constance in 1415, King Sigismund elevated Frederick to the rank of Elector and Margrave of Brandenburg as Frederick I. According to the Iron Kingdom, the most comprehensive book about the History of Prussia written by historian Christopher Clark, in 1417, Elector Frederick purchased Brandenburg from its then-sovereign, Emperor Sigismund, for 400,000 Hungarian guilders.

Margraves of Brandenburg-Küstrin (1535–1571)

The short-lived Margraviate of Brandenburg-Küstrin was set up as a secundogeniture of the House of Hohenzollern.

 1535–1571: John the Wise, Margrave of Brandenburg-Küstrin  (son of Joachim I Nestor, Elector of Brandenburg). He died without issue. The Margraviate of Brandenburg-Küstrin was absorbed in 1571 into Brandenburg.

Margraves of Brandenburg-Schwedt (1688–1788)

Although recognized as a branch of the dynasty since 1688, the Margraviate of Brandenburg-Schwedt remained subordinate to the electors, and was never an independent principality.
 1688–1711: Philip William, Prince in Prussia, Margrave of Brandenburg-Schwedt (son of Frederick William, Elector of Brandenburg)
 1731–1771: Frederick William, Prince in Prussia, Margrave of Brandenburg-Schwedt (son of)
 1771–1788: Frederick Henry, Prince in Prussia, Margrave of Brandenburg Schwedt (brother of)

Dukes of Prussia (1525–1701)

In 1525, the Duchy of Prussia was established as a fief of the King of Poland. Albert of Prussia was the last Grand Master of the Teutonic Knights and the first Duke of Prussia. He belonged to the Ansbach branch of the dynasty. The Duchy of Prussia adopted Protestantism as the official state religion. 
 1525–1568: Albert I
 1568–1618: Albert II Frederick co-heir (son of)
 1568–1571: Joachim I/II Hector co-heir  (also Elector of Brandenburg)
 1578–1603: George Frederick I/I/I/I (Regent, also Margrave of Brandenburg-Ansbach, Margrave of Brandenburg-Kulmbach and Duke of Brandenburg-Jägerndorf)
 1603–1608: Joachim I/I/III Frederick (Regent, also Duke of Brandenburg-Jägerndorf and Elector of Brandenburg)
 1608–1618: John Sigismund (Regent, also Elector of Brandenburg)
 1618–1619: John Sigismund (Regent, also Elector of Brandenburg, after 1618 Brandenburg-Prussia)
 1619–1640: George William I/I (son of, also Elector of Brandenburg)
 1640–1688: Frederick I/III William the Great Elector (son of, also Elector of Brandenburg)
 1688–1701: Frederick II/IV/I (also Elector of Brandenburg and King in Prussia)

From 1701, the title of Duke of Prussia was attached to the title of King in and of Prussia.

Kings in Prussia (1701–1772)

In 1701, the title of King in Prussia was granted, without the Duchy of Prussia being elevated to a Kingdom within Poland but recognized as a kingdom by the Holy Roman Emperor, theoretically the highest sovereign in the West. From 1701 onwards the titles of Duke of Prussia and Elector of Brandenburg were always attached to the title of King in Prussia. The Duke of Prussia adopted the title of king as Frederick I, establishing his status as a monarch whose royal territory lay outside the boundaries of the Holy Roman Empire, with the assent of Emperor Leopold I: Frederick could not be "King of Prussia" because part of Prussia's lands were under the suzerainty of the Crown of the Kingdom of Poland. In Brandenburg and the other Hohenzollern domains within the borders of the empire, he was legally still an elector under the ultimate overlordship of the emperor.  By this time, however, the emperor's authority had become purely nominal over the other German prices outside the immediate hereditary lands of the emperor.  Brandenburg was still legally part of the empire and ruled in personal union with Prussia, though the two states came to be treated as one de facto.  The king was officially Margrave of Brandenburg within the Empire until the Empire's dissolution in 1806. In the age of absolutism, most monarchs were obsessed with the desire to emulate Louis XIV of France with his luxurious palace at Versailles.

In 1772, the Duchy of Prussia was elevated to a kingdom.

Kings of Prussia (1772–1918)

Frederick William's successor, Frederick the Great gained Silesia in the Silesian Wars so that Prussia emerged as a great power. The king was strongly influenced by French culture and civilization and preferred the French language.

In the 1772 First Partition of Poland, the Prussian king Frederick the Great annexed neighboring Royal Prussia, i.e., the Polish voivodeships of Pomerania (Gdańsk Pomerania or Pomerelia), Malbork, Chełmno and the Prince-Bishopric of Warmia, thereby connecting his Prussian and Farther Pomeranian lands and cutting the rest of Poland from the Baltic coast. The territory of Warmia was incorporated into the lands of former Ducal Prussia, which, by administrative deed of 31 January 1772 were named East Prussia. The former Polish Pomerelian lands beyond the Vistula River together with Malbork and Chełmno Land formed the Province of West Prussia with its capital at Marienwerder (Kwidzyn) in 1773. The Polish Partition Sejm ratified the cession on 30 September 1772, whereafter Frederick officially went on to call himself King "of" Prussia.  From 1772 onwards the titles of Duke of Prussia and Elector of Brandenburg were always attached to the title King of Prussia.

In 1871, the Kingdom of Prussia became a constituent member of the German Empire, and the King of Prussia gained the additional title of German Emperor.

German Emperors (1871–1918)

In 1871, the German Empire was proclaimed. With the accession of William I to the newly established imperial German throne, the titles of King of Prussia, Duke of Prussia and Elector of Brandenburg were always attached to the title of German Emperor.

Prussia's Minister President Otto von Bismarck convinced William that German Emperor instead of Emperor of Germany would be appropriate. He became primus inter pares among other German sovereigns.

William II intended to develop a German navy capable of challenging Britain's Royal Navy. The assassination of Archduke Franz Ferdinand of Austria on 28 June 1914 set off the chain of events that led to World War I. As a result of the war, the German, Russian, Austro-Hungarian and Ottoman empires ceased to exist.

In 1918, the German empire was abolished and replaced by the Weimar Republic. After the outbreak of the German revolution in 1918, both Emperor William II and Crown Prince William signed the document of abdication.

Prussian Hohenzollern religion and religious policy
The official religion of the state was "bi-confessional".  John Sigismund's most significant action was his conversion from Lutheranism to Calvinism, after he had earlier equalized the rights of Catholics and Protestants in the Duchy of Prussia under pressure from the King of Poland. He was probably won over to Calvinism during a visit to Heidelberg in 1606, but it was not until 25 December 1613 that he publicly took communion according to the Calvinist rite. The vast majority of his subjects in Brandenburg, including his wife Anna of Prussia, remained deeply Lutheran, however. After the Elector and his Calvinist court officials drew up plans for mass conversion of the population to the new faith in February 1614, as provided for by the rule of Cuius regio, eius religio within the Holy Roman Empire, there were serious protests, with his wife backing the Lutherans. This was doubly important as Anna brought with her the duchy of Prussia into the Brandenburg line of the house and the nascent Brandenburg-Prussian state.  Resistance was so strong that in 1615, John Sigismund backed down and relinquished all attempts at forcible conversion. Instead, he allowed his subjects to be either Lutheran or Calvinist according to the dictates of their own consciences. Henceforward, Brandenburg-Prussia would be a bi-confessional state, with the ruling Hohenzollern house staying Calvinist. 

This situation persisted until Frederick William III of Prussia.  Frederick William was determined to unify the Protestant churches to homogenize their liturgy, organization, and architecture. The long-term goal was to have fully centralized royal control of all the Protestant churches in the Prussian Union of churches.  The merging of the Lutheran and Calvinist (Reformed) confessions to form the United Church of Prussia was highly controversial. Angry responses included a large and well-organized opposition. The crown's aggressive efforts to restructure religion were unprecedented in Prussian history.  In a series of proclamations over several years, the Church of the Prussian Union was formed, bringing together the majority group of Lutherans and the minority group of Reformed Protestants. The main effect was that the government of Prussia had full control over church affairs, with the king himself recognized as the leading bishop.

Brandenburg-Prussian branch since 1918 abdication 

In June 1926, a referendum on expropriating the formerly ruling princes of Germany without compensation failed and as a consequence, the financial situation of the Hohenzollern family improved considerably. A settlement between the state and the family made Cecilienhof property of the state but granted a right of residence to Crown Prince Wilhelm and his wife Cecilie. The family also kept the ownership of Monbijou Palace in Berlin, Oleśnica Castle in Silesia, Rheinsberg Palace, Schwedt Palace and other property until 1945.

Since the abolition of the German monarchy, no Hohenzollern claims to imperial or royal prerogatives are recognized by Germany's Basic Law for the Federal Republic of Germany of 1949, which guarantees a republic.

The communist government of the Soviet occupation zone expropriated all landowners and industrialists; the House of Hohenzollern lost almost all of its fortune, retaining a few company shares and Hohenzollern Castle in West Germany. The Polish government appropriated the Silesian property and the Dutch government seized Huis Doorn, the Emperor's seat in exile.

After German reunification, however, the family was legally able to reclaim their portable property, namely art collections and parts of the interior of their former palaces. Negotiations on the return of or compensation for these assets are not yet completed.

The Berlin Palace, home of the German monarchs, was rebuilt in 2020. The Berlin Palace and the Humboldt Forum are located in the middle of Berlin.

Order of succession

The head of the house is the titular King of Prussia and German Emperor. He also bears a historical claim to the title of Prince of Orange. Members of this line style themselves princes of Prussia.

Georg Friedrich, Prince of Prussia, the current head of the royal Prussian House of Hohenzollern, was married to Princess Sophie of Isenburg on 27 August 2011. On 20 January 2013, she gave birth to twin sons, Carl Friedrich Franz Alexander and Louis Ferdinand Christian Albrecht, in Bremen. Carl Friedrich, the elder of the two, is the heir apparent.

Royal House of Hohenzollern table

Family Tree of the House of Hohenzollern

Swabian branch

The cadet Swabian branch of the House of Hohenzollern was founded by Frederick IV, Count of Zollern. The family ruled three territories with seats at, respectively, Hechingen, Sigmaringen and Haigerloch. The counts were elevated to princes in 1623. The Swabian branch of the Hohenzollerns is Roman Catholic.

Affected by economic problems and internal feuds, the Hohenzollern counts from the 14th century onwards came under pressure by their neighbors, the Counts of Württemberg and the cities of the Swabian League, whose troops besieged and finally destroyed Hohenzollern Castle in 1423. Nevertheless, the Hohenzollerns retained their estates, backed by their Brandenburg cousins and the Imperial House of Habsburg. In 1535, Count Charles I of Hohenzollern (1512–1576) received the counties of Sigmaringen and Veringen as Imperial fiefs.

In 1576, when Charles I, Count of Hohenzollern died, his county was divided to form the three Swabian branches. Eitel Frederick IV took Hohenzollern with the title of Hohenzollern-Hechingen, Karl II took Sigmaringen and Veringen, and Christopher got Haigerloch. Christopher's family died out in 1634.

 Eitel Frederick IV of Hohenzollern-Hechingen (1545–1605)
 Charles II of Hohenzollern-Sigmaringen (1547–1606)
 Christopher of Hohenzollern-Haigerloch (1552–1592)

In 1695, the remaining two Swabian branches entered into an agreement with the Margrave of Brandenburg, which provided that if both branches became extinct, the principalities should fall to Brandenburg. Because of the Revolutions of 1848, Constantine, Prince of Hohenzollern-Hechingen and Karl Anton, Prince of Hohenzollern-Sigmaringen abdicated their thrones in December 1849. The principalities were ruled by the Kings of Prussia from December 1849 onwards, with the Hechingen and Sigmaringen branches obtaining official treatment as cadets of the Prussian royal family.

The Hohenzollern-Hechingen branch became extinct in 1869. A descendant of this branch was Countess Sophie Chotek, morganatic wife of Archduke Franz Ferdinand of Austria-Lotharingen.

Counts of Hohenzollern (1204–1575)

In 1204, the County of Hohenzollern was established out of the fusion of the County of Zollern and the Burgraviate of Nuremberg. The Swabian branch inherited the county of Zollern and, being descended from Frederick I of Nuremberg, were all named "Friedrich" down through the 11th generation. Each one's numeral is counted from the first Friedrich to rule his branch's appanage.

The most senior of these in the 12th century, Count Frederick VIII (d. 1333), had two sons, the elder of whom became Frederick IX (d. 1379), first Count of Hohenzollern, and fathered Friedrich X who left no sons when he died in 1412.

But the younger son of Friedrich VIII, called Friedrich of Strassburg, uniquely, took no numeral of his own, retaining the old title "Count of Zollern" and pre-deceased his brother in 1364/65. Prince Wilhelm Karl zu Isenburg's 1957 genealogical series, Europäische Stammtafeln, says Friedrich of Strassburg shared, rather, in the rule of Zollern with his elder brother until his premature death.

It appears, but is not stated, that Strassburg's son became the recognized co-ruler of his cousin Friedrich X (as compensation for having received no appanage and/or because of incapacity on the part of Friedrich X) and, as such, assumed (or is, historically, attributed) the designation Frederick XI although he actually pre-deceased Friedrich X, dying in 1401.

Friedrich XI, however, left two sons who jointly succeeded their cousin-once-removed, being Count Frederick XII (d. childless 1443) and Count Eitel Friedrich I (d. 1439), the latter becoming the ancestor of all subsequent branches of the Princes of Hohenzollern.

 1204–1251/1255: Frederick IV, also Burgrave of Nuremberg as Frederick II until 1218

 1251/1255–1289: Frederick V
 1289–1298: Frederick VI (d. 1298), son of
 1298–1309: Frederick VII (d. after 1309), son of 
 1309–1333: Frederick VIII (d. 1333), brother of 
 1333–1377: Frederick IX
 1377–1401: Frederick XI
 1401–1426: Frederick XII
 1426–1439: Eitel Frederick I, brother of
 1433–1488: Jobst Nicholas I (1433–1488), son of
 1488–1512: Eitel Frederick II (c. 1452–1512), son of
 1512–1525: Eitel Frederick III (1494–1525), son of
 1525–1575: Charles I (1516–1576), son of

In the 12th century, a son of Frederick I secured the county of Hohenberg. The county remained in the possession of the family until 1486.

The influence of the Swabian line was weakened by several partitions of its lands. In the 16th century, the situation changed completely when Eitel Frederick II, a friend and adviser of the emperor Maximilian I, received the district of Haigerloch. His grandson Charles I was granted the counties of Sigmaringen and Vehringen by Charles V.

Counts, later Princes of Hohenzollern-Hechingen (1576–1849)

The County of Hohenzollern-Hechingen was established in 1576 with allodial rights. It included the original County of Zollern, with the Hohenzollern Castle and the monastery at Stetten.

In December 1849, the ruling princes of both Hohenzollern-Hechingen and Hohenzollern-Sigmaringen abdicated their thrones, and their principalities were incorporated as the Prussian province of Hohenzollern. The Hechingen branch became extinct in dynastic line with Konstantin's death in 1869.

Counts of Hohenzollern-Haigerloch (1576–1634 and 1681–1767)

The County of Hohenzollern-Haigerloch was established in 1576 without allodial rights.

 1576–1601 : Christopher (1552–1592), son of Charles I of Hohenzollern
 1601–1623 : John Christopher (1586–1620), son of 
 1601–1634 : Charles (1588–1634)

Between 1634 and 1681, the county was temporarily integrated into the principality of Hohenzollern-Sigmaringen.

 1681–1702: Francis Anthony, Count of Hohenzollern-Haigerloch
 1702–1750: Ferdinand Leopold, Count of Hohenzollern-Sigmaringen
 1750–1767: Francis Christopher Anton, Count of Hohenzollern-Sigmaringen

Upon the death of Francis Christopher Anton in 1767, the Haigerloch territory was incorporated into the principality of Hohenzollern-Sigmaringen.

Counts, later Princes of Hohenzollern-Sigmaringen (1576–1849)

The County of Hohenzollern-Sigmaringen was established in 1576 with allodial rights and a seat at Sigmaringen Castle.

In December 1849, sovereignty over the principality was yielded to the Franconian branch of the family and incorporated into the Kingdom of Prussia, which accorded status as cadets of the Prussian Royal Family to the Swabian Hohenzollerns. The last ruling Prince of Hohenzollern-Sigmaringen, Karl Anton, would later serve as Minister President of Prussia between 1858 and 1862.

House of Hohenzollern-Sigmaringen after 1849

The family continued to use the title of Prince of Hohenzollern-Sigmaringen. After the Hechingen branch became extinct in 1869, the Sigmaringen branch adopted title of Prince of Hohenzollern.
 1849–1885: Karl Anton i (1811–1885)
 1885–1905: Leopold i (1835–1905), son of
 1905–1927: William i (1864–1927), son of
 1927–1965: Frederick i (1891–1965), son of 
 1965–2010: Friedrich Wilhelm i (1924–2010), son of 
 2010–present: Karl Friedrich i (1952–), son of
 heir apparent: Alexander

In 1866, Prince Charles of Hohenzollern-Sigmaringen was chosen prince of Romania, becoming King Carol I of Romania in 1881.

Charles's elder brother, Leopold, Prince of Hohenzollern, was offered the Spanish throne in 1870 after a revolt exiled Isabella II in 1868. Although encouraged by Bismarck to accept, Leopold declined in the face of French opposition. Nonetheless, Bismarck altered and then published the Ems telegram to create a casus belli: France declared war, but Bismarck's Germany won the Franco-Prussian War.

The head of the Sigmaringen branch (the only extant line of the Swabian branch of the dynasty) is Karl Friedrich, styled His Highness The Prince of Hohenzollern. His official seat is Sigmaringen Castle.

Kings of the Romanians

Reigning (1866–1947)

The Principality of Romania was established in 1862, after the Ottoman vassal states of Wallachia and Moldavia had been united in 1859 under Alexandru Ioan Cuza as Prince of Romania in a personal union. He was deposed in 1866 by the Romanian parliament.

Prince Charles of Hohenzollern-Sigmaringen was invited to become reigning Prince of Romania in 1866. In 1881 he became Carol I, King of Romania. Carol I had an only daughter who died young, so the younger son of his brother Leopold, Prince Ferdinand of Hohenzollern-Sigmaringen, would succeed his uncle as King of Romania in 1914, and his descendants, having converted to the Orthodox Church, continued to reign there until the end of the monarchy in 1947.

Succession since 1947
In 1947, the King Michael I abdicated and the country was proclaimed a People's Republic. Michael did not press his claim to the defunct Romanian throne, but he was welcomed back to the country after half a century in exile as a private citizen, with substantial former royal properties being placed at his disposal. However, his dynastic claim was not recognized by post-Communist Romanians.

On 10 May 2011, King Michael I severed the dynastic ties between the Romanian Royal Family and the House of Hohenzollern-Sigmaringen.
After that the branch of the Hohenzollerns was dynastically represented only by the last king Michael, and his daughters. Having no sons, he declared that his dynastic heir, instead of being a male member of the Hohenzollern-Sigmaringen princely family to which he formerly belonged patrilineally and in accordance with the last Romanian monarchical constitution, should be his eldest daughter Margareta.

The royal house remains popular in Romania and in 2014 Prime Minister Victor Ponta promised a referendum on whether or not to reinstate the monarchy if he were re-elected.

Residences

Palaces of the Prussian Hohenzollerns

Palaces of the Franconian branches

Palaces of the Swabian Hohenzollerns

Property claims 
In mid-2019, it was revealed that Prince Georg Friedrich, Prince of Prussia, Head of the House of Hohenzollern had filed claims for permanent right of residency for his family in Cecilienhof, or one of two other Hohenzollern palaces in Potsdam, as well as return of the family library, 266 paintings, an imperial crown and sceptre, and the letters of Empress Augusta Victoria.

Central to the argument was that Monbijou Palace, which had been permanently given to the family following the fall of the Kaiser, was demolished by the East German government in 1959. Lawyers for the German state argued that the involvement of members of the family in National Socialism had voided any such rights.

In June 2019, a claim made by Prince Georg Friedrich that Rheinfels Castle be returned to the Hohenzollern family was dismissed by a court. In 1924, the ruined Castle had been given by the state of Rhineland-Palatinate to the town of St Goar, under the provision it was not sold. In 1998, the town leased the ruins to a nearby hotel. His case made the claim that this constituted a breach of the bequest.

Coats of arms

Members of the family after abdication

Royal Prussian branch
 Prince Franz Wilhelm of Prussia (1943–)
 Prince Frederick of Prussia (1911–1966)
 Georg Friedrich, Prince of Prussia (1976–)
 Prince Hubertus of Prussia (1909–1950)
 Princess Kira of Prussia (1943–2004)
 Louis Ferdinand, Prince of Prussia (1907–1994)
 Prince Louis Ferdinand of Prussia (1944–1977)
 Prince Michael of Prussia (1940–2014)
 Prince Oskar of Prussia (1959–)
 Wilhelm, Prince of Prussia (1882–1951)
 Prince Wilhelm of Prussia (1906–1940)
 Prince Wilhelm-Karl of Prussia (1922–2007)
 Prince Wilhelm-Karl of Prussia (b. 1955) (2007-present)

Princely Swabian branch
 Princess Augusta Victoria of Hohenzollern (1890–1966)
 Prince Ferfried of Hohenzollern (1943–2022)
 Frederick, Prince of Hohenzollern (1891–1965)
 Friedrich Wilhelm, Prince of Hohenzollern (1924–2010)
 Prince Johann Georg of Hohenzollern (1932–2016)
 Karl Friedrich, Prince of Hohenzollern (1952–)

See also
 Coat of arms of Prussia
 Family tree of the German monarchs
 House Order of Hohenzollern
 Iron Cross
 Monarchism in Romania
 Order of the Black Eagle and Suum cuique
 Order of the Crown (Prussia) and Gott mit uns
 Order of the Red Eagle
 Prussian Army
 Peleș Castle
 Peter Gumpel - Jesuit priest who abandoned the Hohenzollern name
 Wilhelm-Orden

References

Further reading
 Bogdan, Henry. Les Hohenzollern : La dynastie qui a fait l'Allemagne (1061–1918)
 Carlyle, Thomas. A Short Introduction to the House of Hohenzollern (2014)
 Clark, Christopher. Iron Kingdom: The Rise and Downfall of Prussia, 1600–1947 (2009), standard scholarly history 
 Koch, H. W. History of Prussia'' (1987), short scholarly history

External links

Official website of the imperial house of Germany and royal house of Prussia
Official website of the princely house of Hohenzollern-Sigmaringen (in German)
Official website of the royal house of Romania (in Romanian)
Hohenzollern Castle
Sigmaringen Castle 
European Heraldry page 
Hohenzollern heraldry page
 

|-

|-

|-

 
Monarchy in Germany